The 136th Separate Guards Motor Rifle Brigade is a mechanised infantry brigade of the Russian Ground Forces.

On December 1, 1993, the 136th Motor Rifle Brigade was established at Buynaksk, Dagestan. In 1996-97, the brigade was merged with the 204th Guards Motor Rifle Regiment "Uman-Berlin" as the 136th Guards Motor Rifle Brigade. The 204th Guards Motor Rifle Regiment was transferred to the North Caucasus Military District at some point during the transformation of the 94th Guards Motor Rifle Division, returning from the Group of Soviet Forces in Germany, to become the 74th Guards Motor Rifle Brigade in the Siberian Military District.

Plans from 2018 to upgrade the brigade to division status had apparently not completed by 2022, unlike the 19th Motor Rifle Brigade which was reestablished as a division in 2020.

War in Ukraine
The 136th Guards Motor Rifle Brigade conducted combat operations in Luhansk Oblast, Ukraine, in 2014, during the War in Donbas.

The brigade took part in the 2022 Russian invasion of Ukraine, operating north-east of Crimea on the southern front. Reportedly, the brigade's chief of staff, Colonel Viktor Ivanovich Isaykin, was killed in the first days of the war.

Subordinated units
The brigade comprises, among other units, a tank battalion, three motor rifle battalions, artillery, and engineers.

References

External links

1993 establishments in Russia
Mechanised infantry brigades of Russia
Military units and formations awarded the Order of the Red Banner
Military units and formations established in 1993